David McVean House, also known as the McVean-Jones-Reeves House, is a historic home located at Scottsville in Monroe County, New York. It is a brick vernacular Federal-style house on a pargeted cut-stone foundation.  The five-by-three-bay main block is two stories in height, while the rear wing is one and one-half stories.

It was listed on the National Register of Historic Places in 2006.

References

Houses on the National Register of Historic Places in New York (state)
Federal architecture in New York (state)
Houses in Monroe County, New York
National Register of Historic Places in Monroe County, New York